Myrmica colax is a species of ant, originally described by Cole as Paramyrmica colax. Until now, it is only known from its type locality in the Davis Mountains, Texas, USA. He found M. colax in a M. striolagaster colony and considers the two species quite similar in morphology. This suggests M. colax might be an inquiline.

References
 Cole, A. C., Jr. (1957). "Paramyrmica, a new North American genus of ants allied to Myrmica Latreille. (Hymenoptera: Formicidae)." J. Tenn. Acad. Sci. 32: 37–42.

External links

Myrmica
Hymenoptera of North America
Insects of the United States
Insects described in 1957